Gachantivá is a town and municipality in the Ricaurte Province, part of the Colombian department of Boyacá.

Etymology 
The name Gachantivá comes from Chibcha and means "chief of the Gacha".

History 
The area of Gachantivá before the Spanish conquest was inhabited by the Muisca, organised in their loose Muisca Confederation. The cacique of Gachantivá was loyal to the zaque of Hunza.

Modern Gachantivá was founded in 1715 by Juan José Neira.

Economy 
Main economical activities of Gachantivá are agriculture and livestock farming. Among the agricultural products cultivated are maize, potatoes, yuca, coffee, blackberries, beans and peas.

Gallery

References 

Municipalities of Boyacá Department
Populated places established in 1715
1715 establishments in the Spanish Empire
Muisca Confederation
Muysccubun